Jehad Al-Turbani (Arabic:جهاد الترباني) is a Palestinian author, poet and historical researcher. He was interested with the Islamic history. He was famous for his supportive poetry of the Syrian revolution against Bashar Al Assad’s government and the Egyptian revolution against Hosni Mubarak’s government. He wrote poems that were sung by several singers like Fadel Chaker,Nayef Al Sharhaan, strangers for the Islamic art's team.

He is the author of (A Hundred Greats of Islamic Nation Who Changed the Course of History), (101 Barbosa's mystery) and (101 Aryos's secret) and the (Mohammed's school book).

One of his most important popular poems (we are heroes, we don't bend our heads) that strangers for the Islamic art's team sang, and (Taqadamo) poem that praises the revolters on Bashar's government in Syria. He participated also in Sawaed Al Ekhaa program.

Works

Books 
 Maa Min Authamaa Ummat Al-islam ghayaro Majra Al Tareekh
 Barbosa's Mystery 101
 Argos's Mystery 101
 The Fandal' s war 101
 Mohammed's peace be upon him school
 The School of the Sahabaah

Poems 
One of the most important poems that Jehad Al-Turbani wrote is
 (Ma wahana)
 (Nahno al Abtaal)

See also 
 Raghib Al Sarjani

References 

Palestinian poets
21st-century Palestinian writers